No. 116 Helicopter Unit (Tankbusters) is a Helicopter Unit and is equipped with HAL Chetak and based at Jodhpur Air Force Station.

History
The 116 Helicopter unit was formed in 1967 at Sarsawa and it operates Chetak and the Advanced Light Helicopter HAL Dhruv. The President of India awarded Standards to 116 Helicopter Unit of Indian Air Force at Jodhpur on 5 Mar  2015.

Assignments
The air combatants of this unit have undertaken numerous sorties for executing relief and rescue operations in various parts of the country.

Aircraft
HAL Chetak

References

116